Wild Youth may refer to:

 Junge Wilde, a 20th-century art movement in the German-speaking countries and Denmark
 Youth of the Beast, 1963 Japanese yakuza film directed by Seijun Suzuki
 "Wild Youth", a 1977 single from the punk band Generation X
 Naked Youth, also known as Wild Youth, a 1961 American film directed by John F. Schreyer
 Wild Youth (album), a 2016 debut studio album by Steve Angello
 Wild Youth (band), an Irish indie rock band 
 Wild Youth (film), a lost 1918 American silent drama film
 The Wild Youth, an EP by Daughter